Sollfrank is a German language surname. Notable people with the name include:
 Cornelia Sollfrank (1960), German digital artist
 Dominik Sollfrank (1998), German footballer

References 

German-language surnames